The Tivoli Theatre was a theatre on Francis Street in The Liberties, Dublin which closed in 2019 and was demolished shortly afterwards for replacement by a hotel

The theatre opened on 21 December 1934 as a replacement for an earlier Tivoli Theatre located on Burgh Quay, which had closed in May 1928.

Built to the designs of architect Vincent Kelly with seating provided for 700. The Tivoli Theatre opened as a cine-variety theatre, but by the late-1930s it had converted to full-time cinema use and was renamed Tivoli Cinema.

The Tivoli Cinema was closed in September 1964. It was converted into a nightclub and a shop; before finally re-opening as a live theatre in 1987 and renamed Tivoli Theatre. At time of closing, the upper theatre could seat 475; and the lower venue was in operation as a nightclub

The walls of the carpark had become a noted street art location and the planning permission to demolish the theatre required the extant art to be photographed and documented prior to demolition

Notable Performances 
The venue had seen The Cranberries, Oasis, Blur, Sinéad O'Connor, Suede, The Beastie Boys, Rage Against the Machine, Deadmau5, Perfume Genius, and $uicideBoy$ perform.

That Petrol Emotion played the Tivoli three times, including their Irish farewell gig in 1994. Recordings from that concert were included on the live album Final Flame (Fire, Detonation And Sublime Chaos).

References

Theatres in Dublin (city)